The women's long jump at the 2013 World Championships in Athletics was held at the Luzhniki Stadium on 10–11 August.

Summary
Two time defending champion, current Olympic champion and world leading Brittney Reese squeaked through qualifying in the last qualifying position.  Her 6.57 tied with teammate Funmi Jimoh so she won her position by her second best jump (also 6.57 with Jimoh not having a second legal jump).  Shara Proctor led three automatic qualifiers.

In the final, her first round 6.50 was more of the same, while Blessing Okagbare jumped 6.89 for the lead.  Reese's 7.01 to start the second round changed the tune, moving the marker beyond any else's range.  Volha Sudarava's 6.82 put her into third place.  In the fifth round, Ivana Španović's Serbian national record of 6.82 equaled Sudarava and Okagbare improved her best to 6.99, just 2 cm short of Reese.  Reese followed with a meaningless 6.95.  Okagbare's final attempt was 6.96, again close but too short to take the win.  Left with a tie for third, officials again had to look to the second best attempt for the tiebreaker.  Španović jumped 6.70 in the first round to get the bronze over Sudarava's 6.66, also in the first round.

Records
Prior to the competition, the established records were as follows.

Qualification standards

Schedule

Results

Qualification
Qualification: 6.75 m (Q) and at least 12 best (q) advanced to the final.

Final
The final was held on 11 August.

References

External links
Long jump results at IAAF website

Long jump
Long jump at the World Athletics Championships
2013 in women's athletics